Yates Center is a city in and the county seat of Woodson County, Kansas, United States.  As of the 2020 census, the population of the city was 1,352.

History

Yates Center was founded in August 1875. It was named for Abner Yates, the original owner of the town site, who donated an entire block around the courthouse, land for the churches, a city park, and a lot each for the first two children born in the town. Yates Center is the only town in Kansas to be selected as a county seat before there was a house or inhabitant within its boundaries.

Over thirty buildings in downtown Yates Center, centering on Courthouse Square, are included in the Yates Center Courthouse Square Historic District.

Geography

Climate
The climate in this area is characterized by hot, humid summers and generally mild to cool winters.  According to the Köppen Climate Classification system, Yates Center has a humid subtropical climate, abbreviated "Cfa" on climate maps.

Demographics

2010 census
As of the census of 2010, there were 1,417 people, 664 households, and 347 families living in the city. The racial makeup of the city was 95.3% White, 0.4% African American, 1.1% Native American, 0.1% Asian, 0.5% from other races, and 2.7% from two or more races. Hispanic or Latino of any race were 1.6% of the population.

There were 664 households, of which 22.6% had children under the age of 18 living with them, 39.5% were married couples living together, 9.5% had a female householder with no husband present, 3.3% had a male householder with no wife present, and 47.7% were non-families. 41.9% of all households were made up of individuals, and 20.5% had someone living alone who was 65 years of age or older. The average household size was 2.08 and the average family size was 2.84.

The median age in the city was 45.1 years. 21.2% of residents were under the age of 18; 6.8% were between the ages of 18 and 24; 21.9% were from 25 to 44; 28% were from 45 to 64; and 22.2% were 65 years of age or older. The gender makeup of the city was 46.9% male and 53.1% female.

2000 census
As of the census of 2000, there were 1,599 people, 716 households, and 435 families living in the city. The racial makeup of the city was 98.37% White, 0.19% African American, 0.69% Native American, and 0.75% from two or more races. Hispanic or Latino of any race were 1.50% of the population.

There were 716 households, out of which 26.3% had children under the age of 18 living with them, 47.3% were married couples living together, 10.5% had a female householder with no husband present, and 39.2% were non-families. 37.6% of all households were made up of individuals, and 23.2% had someone living alone who was 65 years of age or older. The average household size was 2.17 and the average family size was 2.86.

In the city, the population was spread out, with 21.8% under the age of 18, 8.7% from 18 to 24, 21.3% from 25 to 44, 20.3% from 45 to 64, and 28.0% who were 65 years of age or older. The median age was 44 years. For every 100 females, there were 81.1 males. For every 100 females age 18 and over, there were 79.0 males.

The median income for a household in the city was $23,920, and the median income for a family was $34,018. Males had a median income of $25,250 versus $17,054 for females. The per capita income for the city was $14,180. About 9.0% of families and 12.3% of the population were below the poverty line, including 11.2% of those under age 18 and 18.5% of those age 65 or over.

Education
The community is served by Woodson USD 366 public school district.

Gallery

References

Further reading

 Toedman, Neil L. Welcome Yates Center: Population 2256, Hay Capital of the World. (1952)

External links

 City of Yates Center
 Yates Center - Directory of Public Officials
 Yates Center city map, KDOT

Cities in Woodson County, Kansas
Cities in Kansas
County seats in Kansas